The Yaselda (alternative transliteration Jasieĺda), is a river in Brest Region in south-west Belarus. It is linked via the Dnieper–Bug Canal to the city of Pinsk. It is a left tributary of the Pripyat. It is connected to the Oginski Canal.

Yaselda in literature 

 The Slaughterman's Daughter by Yaniv Iczkovits

References

External links

Rivers of Brest Region
Rivers of Grodno Region
Rivers of Belarus